Kim Aamai Revell (born 16 March 1975) is an Australian retired football player. She was a member of the national team between 1995 and 2001. She played club football for the Queensland Sting.

References

External links
 Profile at Australian Sports Commission

1975 births
Living people
Australian women's soccer players
Australia women's international soccer players
Women's association football midfielders